Child support is an ongoing, periodic payment made by a parent for the financial benefit of a child.

Child support may also refer to:

 Child Support (New Zealand), how child support is regulated and managed in New Zealand
 Child Support (game show), a 2018 American game show
 "Child Support" (song), by Barbara Mandrell, 1987

See also
 Alimony